Kozlu may refer to:

Kozlu, Zonguldak, a town in northern Turkey
Kozlu coal mine in Kozlu, Zonguldak
Kozlu, Seydişehir, a village in Turkey
Kozlu, Gercüş, a town in southeastern Turkey
 Kozlu, Ayvacık
 Kozlu, Pazaryolu
Kozlu, Sındırgı, a village